On a roller coaster train, the underfriction, up-lift, or up-stop wheels are a device to keep the train from jumping off the track under intense movement. The design was patented in 1919 by John A. Miller.

References 

Roller coaster technology